Libreboot (briefly known as GNU Libreboot) is a free software project based on coreboot, aimed at replacing the proprietary BIOS firmware contained by most computers. Libreboot is a lightweight system designed to perform only the minimum number of tasks necessary to load and run a modern 32-bit or 64-bit operating system.

Characteristics
Libreboot is established as a distribution of coreboot, but with proprietary binary blobs removed from coreboot. Libreboot makes coreboot easy to use by automating the build and installation processes.

Libreboot developers have reverse engineered the firmware from Intel and created a utility to create a free firmware that meets the specifications from Intel.

References

Free BIOS implementations
Firmware
Custom firmware
Software related to embedded Linux
2013 software
Open-source firmware